Vladimir Vasilievich Rusakevich (born 13 September 1947) is a retired Belarusian politician and Ambassador.

In 1963 he began his career, as the head of the library and teacher in the high school of Hotynitskoy in the Hantsavichy District
From 1970 to 1971 he was director of a school in the Ivatsevichy District.
He has held several senior positions in the Komsomol, the party, and was chairman of the executive committee Hantsavichy and Deputy Chairman of the Brest Regional Executive Committee.
From 1973 to 1994 he was Deputy member of the District, Regional Council.
From 1990 to 1995 he was member of the Supreme Council of Belarus.
from March to December 1994 he was member of the commission on the work of the Soviets of People's Deputies and the development of self-government.
In 1991 he was Deputy Chairman of the Supreme Council.
From 1994 to 1996 he was Deputy Prime Minister of the Republic of Belarus and supervised culture, education, science, sports, health and social protection.
From 1997 to 2000 he was deputy head of the Presidential Administration of the Republic of Belarus in charge of personnel management issues.
From July 2000 to  he was Ambassador Extraordinary and Plenipotentiary of the Republic of Belarus Beijing (People's Republic of China).
From  to  he was Minister of Information of the Republic of Belarus.

References

1947 births
Living people
Ambassadors of Belarus to China
Belarusian politicians
Government ministers of Belarus
People from Ivatsevichy District
Communist Party of the Soviet Union members
Recipients of the Order of Francysk Skaryna
Belarusian individuals subject to the U.S. Department of the Treasury sanctions
Specially Designated Nationals and Blocked Persons List